Deane Rykerson is an American politician and architect from Maine. A Democrat, Rykerson was first elected to the Maine House of Representatives in 2012. He represented District 151, which includes southern York County Kittery. An architect by training, Rykerson earned Bachelor of Arts degrees at Stony Brook University in New York in 1972 and Boston Architectural College in 1989 as well as a Masters in Architecture from Harvard University in 1996.

References

External links
 Rykerson Architecture & Pomeroy Landscapes

1950 births
Living people
Stony Brook University alumni
Boston Architectural College alumni
Harvard Graduate School of Design alumni
Democratic Party members of the Maine House of Representatives
People from Dodge City, Kansas
People from Kittery, Maine
21st-century American politicians